Idomacromia is a genus of dragonfly in the family Corduliidae. It contains the following species:
 Idomacromia jillianae
 Idomacromia proavita

References 

Corduliidae
Taxonomy articles created by Polbot